Sedalia station, also known as the Katy Depot, is a historic train station located at Sedalia, Pettis County, Missouri, United States.  It was built in 1895 by the Missouri, Kansas and Texas Railroad. Designed by New York architect Bradford Gilbert, the depot  is a 2 1/2-story, Romanesque Revival style red brick building on a limestone foundation.  It has a two-story, modified octagonal primary facade, slate-covered hip roofs, and a broad encircling gallery.  The station closed to passenger traffic in May 1958. The building houses the Sedalia welcome center.

It was listed on the National Register of Historic Places in 1979 as the Missouri, Kansas and Texas Railroad Depot.

See also
 Sedalia station

References

External links
Katy Depot website

Sedalia
Railway stations on the National Register of Historic Places in Missouri
Romanesque Revival architecture in Missouri
Railway stations in the United States opened in 1895
National Register of Historic Places in Pettis County, Missouri
Railway stations closed in 1958
Former railway stations in Missouri